The Magnificent is the fourteenth studio album by Beenie Man.

Track listing
"No More Talk" – 3:45
"Murder" – 3:25
"Tom Bully" – 3:34
"Body Good Like Gold" – 3:24
"Warn Them" – 3:32
"Pretty Matey"– 3:49
"Follow Mi Lyrics" – 3:43
"Sing My Song" – 3:52
"Borro'lero" – 3:50
"The More I Love" – 3:41
"Mocking Bird Song" – 3:36
"You a Fool" – 3:31
"A New Gear" – 3:46
"The Greatest" – 3:40
"The Magnificent Beenie Man" – 3:28
"Do the Beenie Shuffle" – 3:38
"Hop on Board" – 3:29

References

Beenie Man albums
2002 albums